The Mount Emu Creek (Aboriginal Australian:Tarnpirr), a perennial creek of the Glenelg Hopkins catchment, is located in the Western District of Victoria, Australia.

Course and features
It is the longest creek in Victoria. The creek rises near  and flows generally south by southwest, joined by six tributaries, before reaching its confluence with the Hopkins River, northeast of Warrnambool. The river descends  over its  course. Mount Emu Creek is the major waterway within the Hopkins basin. The main drainage area is from numerous small tributaries and gullies to the east and west of the waterway, including Darlington Creek. The main tributary of Mount Emu Creek is Trawalla Creek, that drains the area of highest rainfall within the sub-catchment.

It joins the Hopkins River, which eventually leads out to sea at Warrnambool.

The Elingamite Creek drains Lake Elingamite and flows into the Mount Emu Creek south of Terang.

Fishing
The Mount Emu system is a very popular fishing stream with residents and visitors along its course, where trophy sized trout can be pursued. The creek is regularly stocked with brown trout from the Department of Natural Resources and Environment (with the assistance of the Terang Angling Club). There is also a small population of native brown trout. Some of the more popular spots to be fished are McKinnons bridge, Castlecary Road bridge, Ayresford Road and Panmure bridge. Other fish to be caught include redfin, eels, tench, tupong and black fish. In several locations between Pura Pura and Darlington, yellowbelly are known to be caught on worm (no float).

Platypuses 
Mount Emu Creek abounds in redfin and is the home of many platypuses. Surveys in 1991 and 1996 confirmed that platypus are breeding successfully right in the heart of Skipton township, where on a bend in the creek at Stewart Park in the centre of town is a platform built on the banks of the creek from which to observe them. An all night research session along the Mount Emu Creek was conducted by the Australian Platypus Conservancy in August 2003, in collaboration with Skipton's Stewart Park Committee. A baby female was one of six platypuses found in the  section of the creek. Geoff Williams, a biologist with the Conservancy, said that the youngster was in really good condition and her presence confirmed that successful breeding is taking place in the township.

Murdering Gully massacre
The Murdering Gully massacre occurred in a gully on Mount Emu Creek, where a small stream adjoins from Mérida station (near Camperdown) in early 1839. Between 35 and 40 men, women and children of the Tarnbeere gundidj clan were shot dead by Frederick Taylor and other shepherds for the killing of several sheep.

See also

References

Glenelg Hopkins catchment
Rivers of Barwon South West (region)
Rivers of Grampians (region)
Western District (Victoria)